The World Light Heavyweight Championship was one of the first Light Heavyweight professional wrestling championship in Australia.

Title history

See also

Professional wrestling in Australia
World Light Heavyweight Championship
World Light Heavyweight Championship (National Wrestling Association)

References

Light heavyweight wrestling championships
World professional wrestling championships
Professional wrestling in Australia